Tarragona station may refer to:

 Tarragona metro station, in the city of Barcelona, Catalonia, Spain
 Tarragona railway station, in the city of Tarragona, Catalonia, Spain